The 1996–97 Eastern European Hockey League season, was the second season of the multi-national ice hockey league. Nine teams participated in the league, and Juniors Riga of Latvia won the championship.

Regular season

Playoffs

3rd place
Polimir Novopolotsk 3 HK Neman Grodno 1

External links
Season on hockeyarchives.info

2
Eastern European Hockey League seasons